Count Friedrich IV of Zollern ( – ), also known as Burgrave Friedrich II of Nuremberg, was Burgrave of Nuremberg from 1204 to 1218 and Count of Zollern from 1218 until his death.

Life
Friedrich IV was the younger son of Friedrich I of Nuremberg-Zollern ( – ) and his wife Sophia of Raabs (died ) . After his father's death, he was appointed as his successor as Burgrave of Nuremberg.  In 1218, Friedrich and his older brother Conrad I divided their inheritance: Conrad received the Franconian possessions and became Burgrave of Nuremberg; Friedrich received the ancestral County of Zollern.  He is considered the founder of the Swabian line of the House of Hohenzollern.

He died  and was succeeded as Count of Zollern by his son Friedrich V (died 24 May 1289).

See also
House of Hohenzollern

References

Max Spindler, Andreas Kraus: Geschichte Frankens bis zum Ausgang des 18. Jahrhunderts = Handbuch der bayrischen Geschichte, vol 3.1, Beck, Munich, 1997, 

Burgraves of Nuremberg
Counts of Zollern
House of Hohenzollern
1180s births
Year of birth uncertain
1250s deaths
Year of death uncertain
13th-century German nobility